Dicepolia marionalis is a species of moth of the family Crambidae. It is found in Madagascar.

Viette placed this moth in close relationship to: Autocharis carnosalis  (Saalmüller, 1880).

References

Odontiinae
Moths described in 1958
Moths of Madagascar
Moths of Africa